Gabby Beans is an American actress, writer, and producer. She was nominated for a Tony Award for Best Actress in a Play in 2022 for her role in play The Skin of Our Teeth.

Biography 
Beans received her B.A. from Columbia University as a double major in neuroscience and theatre. She received her MA in Classical Acting from the London Academy of Music and Dramatic Art.

She made her Broadway debut with The Skin of Our Teeth in 2022, playing as Sabina the maid. She also made brief appearances in TV shows including Succession, House of Cards, and Ray Donovan.

Acting credits

Television

Theatre

Film

Awards and nominations

References

External links 

 
 
 

Living people
Columbia College (New York) alumni
Alumni of the London Academy of Music and Dramatic Art
American stage actresses
Year of birth missing (living people)